Jacob Tjørnelund (born 31 December 1991) is a Danish professional footballer who plays as a left-back for Danish 1st Division club Hobro IK.

Career
Tjørnelund progressed through the youth academy of SønderjyskE, where he made his professional debut on 16 October 2010 at age 18 in a 1–0 home win over AaB in the Danish Superliga. He came on as a substitute for Kenneth Fabricius. After three years as part of the SønderjyskE first team, his contract expired in December 2013.

Despite interest from Dutch club De Graafschap where he had been on a trial, Tjørnelund, who was a free agent after his contract expired, signed a six-month contract with Hobro IK. After a successful first term at the club, where he helped them win promotion to the Superliga for first time in club history, he signed a two-year contract extension on 1 July 2014.

As his contract expired in 2017, Tjørnelund initially chose to leave Hobro but ultimately changed his decision and signed a contract extension.

Honours

Hobro
1st Division: 2016–17

References

External links

Official Danish Superliga stats

1991 births
Living people
Danish men's footballers
SønderjyskE Fodbold players
Hobro IK players
Danish Superliga players
Association football defenders
People from Haderslev Municipality
Danish 1st Division players
Sportspeople from the Region of Southern Denmark